Eoophyla is a genus of moths of the family Crambidae. It was erected by Charles Swinhoe in 1900.

Species
angustalis species group
Eoophyla angustalis (Sauber in Semper, 1902)
Eoophyla becki Mey, 2009
Eoophyla fontis Speidel, 2003
Eoophyla liwaguensis Mey, 2009
Eoophyla nussi Speidel, 2003
ceratucha species group
Eoophyla boernickei Mey, 2006
Eoophyla ceratucha (Meyrick, 1894)
Eoophyla continentalis Jaenicke & Mey, 2011
Eoophyla corniculata Jaenicke & Mey, 2011
Eoophyla nigripilosa Yoshiyasu, 1987
Eoophyla profalcatalis Jaenicke & Mey, 2011
Eoophyla promiscuata Jaenicke & Mey, 2011
Eoophyla silvicola Jaenicke & Mey, 2011
Eoophyla sumatroceratucha Jaenicke & Mey, 2011
crassicornalis species group
Eoophyla adjunctalis (Snellen, 1895)
Eoophyla aureolalis (Snellen, 1876)
Eoophyla bipunctalis (Walker, 1866)
Eoophyla callilithalis Speidel, 2003
Eoophyla clasnaumanni Speidel & Mey in Mey & Speidel, 2005
Eoophyla colonialis (Guenée, 1854)
Eoophyla crassicornalis (Guenée, 1854)
Eoophyla latifascialis (Snellen, 1876)
Eoophyla mindanensis Speidel, 1998
Eoophyla myanmarica Mey & Speidel, 2005
Eoophyla philippinensis Speidel, 1998
Eoophyla polydora (Meyrick, 1897)
gibbosalis species group
Eoophyla cocos Mey, 2009
Eoophyla gibbosalis (Guenée, 1854)
Eoophyla hamalis (Snellen, 1876)
Eoophyla hirsuta (Semper, 1899)
Eoophyla mimeticalis (Caradja, 1925)
Eoophyla ochripicta (Moore, 1888)
Eoophyla parapomasalis (Hampson, 1897)
Eoophyla saturatalis (Snellen, 1890)
Eoophyla simplicialis (Snellen, 1876)
Eoophyla sinensis (Hampson, 1897)
litoralis species group
Eoophyla litoralis Speidel, 2003
Eoophyla montanalis Speidel, 2003
peribocalis species group
Eoophyla conjunctalis (Wileman & South, 1917)
Eoophyla dominalis (Walker, 1866)
Eoophyla ectopalis (Hampson, 1906)
Eoophyla halialis (Walker, 1859)
Eoophyla inouei Yoshiyasu, 1979
Eoophyla melanops (Hampson, 1896)
Eoophyla mormodes (Meyrick, 1897)
Eoophyla nectalis (Snellen, 1876)
Eoophyla sejunctalis (Snellen, 1876)
Eoophyla thaiensis Yoshiyasu, 1987
quinqualis species group
Eoophyla argyropis (Meyrick, 1894)
Eoophyla basilissa (Meyrick, 1894)
Eoophyla bicolensis Speidel, 2003
Eoophyla gephyrotis (Meyrick, 1897)
Eoophyla quezonensis Speidel, 2003
Eoophyla quinqualis (Snellen, 1892)
Eoophyla richteri Speidel, 2003
Eoophyla yeni Speidel, 2003
schintlmeisteri species group
Eoophyla cernyi Speidel, 2003
Eoophyla cervinalis Speidel, 2003
Eoophyla leytensis Speidel, 2003
Eoophyla napoleoni Speidel, 2003
Eoophyla schintlmeisteri Speidel, 2003
simplex species group
Eoophyla naumanni Speidel, 2003
Eoophyla simplex (West, 1931)
snelleni species group
Eoophyla pulchralis Speidel, 2003
Eoophyla snelleni Semper, 1902
unknown species group
Eoophyla abstrusa Li, You & Wang, 2003
Eoophyla accra (Strand, 1913)
Eoophyla acroperalis (Hampson, 1897)
Eoophyla argenteopicta (Hampson, 1917)
Eoophyla argentimaculalis (Hampson, 1917)
Eoophyla argyrilinale (Hampson, 1897)
Eoophyla argyrotoxalis Pagenstecher, 1886
Eoophyla assegaia Mey, 2011
Eoophyla aurantipennis (Hampson, 1917)
Eoophyla belladotae Agassiz, 2012
Eoophyla brunnealis (Hampson, 1897)
Eoophyla cameroonensis Agassiz, 2012
Eoophyla candidalis Pagenstecher, 1886
Eoophyla capensis (Hampson, 1906)
Eoophyla carcassoni Agassiz, 2012
Eoophyla cervinalis (Hampson, 1897)
Eoophyla chrysoxantha (Hampson, 1917)
Eoophyla citrialis Agassiz, 2012
Eoophyla coniferalis (Hampson, 1917)
Eoophyla costifascialis (Hampson, 1917)
Eoophyla cyclozonalis (Hampson, 1906)
Eoophyla dendrophila Speidel, Mey & Schulze, 2002
Eoophyla dentisigna Agassiz, 2012
Eoophyla diopsalis (Hampson, 1897)
Eoophyla discalis (Hampson, 1906)
Eoophyla dolichoplagia (Hampson, 1917)
Eoophyla dominulalis (Walker, 1866)
Eoophyla euprepialis Agassiz, 2012
Eoophyla euryxantha (Meyrick, 1936)
Eoophyla evidens Li, You & Wang in Li, You & Wang, 2003
Eoophyla excentrica Mey & Speidel, 1999
Eoophyla flavifascialis (Hampson, 1917)
Eoophyla fuscicostalis (Rothschild, 1915)
Eoophyla goniophoralis (Hampson, 1906)
Eoophyla grandifuscalis Agassiz, 2012
Eoophyla guillermetorum (Viette, 1988)
Eoophyla hauensteini Speidel & Mey, 1999
Eoophyla hemicryptis (Meyrick, 1897)
Eoophyla hemimelaena (Hampson, 1917)
Eoophyla hemithermalis (Hampson, 1917)
Eoophyla heptopis (Hampson, 1897)
Eoophyla idiotis (Meyrick, 1894)
Eoophyla intensa (Rothschild, 1915)
Eoophyla interopalis Agassiz, 2012
Eoophyla junctiscriptalis (Hampson, 1897)
Eoophyla kingstoni Agassiz, 2012
Eoophyla latifascia Munroe, 1959
Eoophyla latipennis Munroe, 1959
Eoophyla leroii (Strand, 1915)
Eoophyla leucostola (Hampson, 1917)
Eoophyla leucostrialis (Hampson, 1906)
Eoophyla limalis Viette, 1957
Eoophyla longiplagialis (Hampson, 1917)
Eoophyla mediofascialis (Hampson, 1917)
Eoophyla menglensis Li, An, Li & Liu, 1995
Eoophyla mesoscialis (Hampson, 1917)
Eoophyla metataxalis (Hampson, 1906)
Eoophyla metazonalis (Hampson, 1917)
Eoophyla metriodora (Meyrick, 1897)
Eoophyla mimicalis (Hampson, 1917)
Eoophyla munroei Agassiz & Mey, 2011
Eoophyla nandinalis (Hampson, 1906)
Eoophyla nigerialis (Hampson, 1906)
Eoophyla nigriplagialis (Hampson, 1917)
Eoophyla nyasalis (Hampson, 1917)
Eoophyla nymphulalis (Hampson, 1906)
Eoophyla obliquivitta (Hampson, 1917)
Eoophyla obliquivitta (Hampson, 1917)
Eoophyla orphninalis Pagenstecher, 1886
Eoophyla ovomaculalis (Rothschild, 1915)
Eoophyla palleuca (Hampson, 1906) (formerly E. lobophoralis species group)
Eoophyla pentopalis (Hampson, 1906)
Eoophyla persimilis Munroe, 1959
Eoophyla pervenustalis (Hampson, 1897)
Eoophyla piscatorum Agassiz, 2012
Eoophyla platyxantha Agassiz, 2012
Eoophyla postbasalis (Rothschild, 1915)
Eoophyla praestabilis Pagenstecher, 1886
Eoophyla principensis Agassiz, 2012
Eoophyla pulchralis (Rothschild, 1915)
Eoophyla quadriplagiata (Hampson, 1917)
Eoophyla reunionalis (Viette, 1988)
Eoophyla rufocastanea (Rothschild, 1915)
Eoophyla ruwenzoriensis Agassiz, 2012
Eoophyla scioxantha Meyrick, 1937
Eoophyla similis (Rothschild, 1915)
Eoophyla stepheni Agassiz, 2012
Eoophyla stresemanni (Rothschild, 1915)
Eoophyla tanzanica Agassiz, 2012
Eoophyla tetropalis (Hampson, 1906)
Eoophyla thermichrysia (Hampson, 1917)
Eoophyla thomasi Munroe, 1959
Eoophyla trichoceralis (Hampson, 1897)
Eoophyla tripletale (Hampson, 1897)
Eoophyla tripunctalis (Snellen, 1872)
Eoophyla uniplagialis (Rothschild, 1915)
Eoophyla waigaoalis C. Swinhoe, 1900
Eoophyla wollastoni (Rothschild, 1915)

Former species
Eoophyla alba Mey, 2009
Eoophyla falcatalis (Snellen, 1901)
Eoophyla lithocharis (Meyrick, 1936)
Eoophyla peribocalis (Walker, 1859)
Eoophyla periopis (Hampson, 1910)
Eoophyla sambesica (Strand, 1909)

References

 , 2011: Revision der Eoophyla ceratucha-Gruppe und ihre Verbreitung in Südostasien (Lepidoptera, Pyraloidea, Crambidae: Acentropinae). Beiträge zur Entomologie 61 (1): 3-87.
 , 2003: A systematic study of the genus Eoophyla Swinhoe in China, with descriptions of two new species (Lepidoptera: Crambidae: Nymphulinae). Acta Zootaxonomica Sinica 28 (2) 295–301.
 , 2006, Eine neue Art der Gattung Eoophyla Swinhoe, 1900 von Borneo (Lepidoptera: Crambidae, Acentropinae), Entomologische Zeitschrift 116 (2): 91–93.
 , 2009: New aquatic moths from high elevations of Mt. Kinabalu in northern Borneo (Lepidoptera: Pyraloidea: Acentropinae). Entomologische Zeitschrift 119 (3). 99-107.
 , 2011: New and little known species of Lepidoptera of southwestern Africa. Esperiana Buchreihe zur Entomologie Memoir 6: 146–261.
 , 1958: Catalogue of Snellen's types of Pyralidae, with selections of lectotypes. Tijdschrift voor Entomologie 101 (2): 65–88.
 , 1998: The genus Eoophyla Swinhoe, 1900 from the Philippine Islands (Lepidoptera: Crambidae: Acentropinae). Nachrichten des Entomologischen Vereins Apollo Supplement 17: 465–474.
 , 2003: New species of Aquatic moths from the Philippines (Lepidoptera: Crambidae). Insecta Koreana 20 (1): 7-49.
 , 1999: Catalogue of the Oriental Acentropinae (Lepidoptera: Crambidae). Tijdschrift voor Entomologie 142 (1): 125–142. Full article: .

 
Acentropinae
Crambidae genera
Taxa named by Charles Swinhoe